V. T. Vijayan is an Indian film editor who works in Malayalam, Telugu, and Tamil films. He has collaborated in the past with editors including B. Lenin N.Ganesh Kumar and T. S. Jay.

Selected filmography

References

External links
 

Living people
Indian film editors
Telugu film editors
Malayalam film editors
Best Editor National Film Award winners
Tamil film editors
Tamil Nadu State Film Awards winners
Film editors from Tamil Nadu
Year of birth missing (living people)